Reed Hill is a  biological Site of Special Scientific Interest (SSSI) west of Stonesfield in Oxfordshire. It partly overlaps Stonesfield Slate Mines SSSI.

This sheltered dry valley has unimproved limestone grassland, secondary woodland and scrub. A spring at the northern end makes the ground there seasonally damp. Invertebrates include the small blue, Duke of Burgundy and dark green fritillary butterflies, the small shield bug Neotti-glossa pusilla, the beetle Oedemera lurida and the spider Hypsosinga pygmaea.

References

 
Sites of Special Scientific Interest in Oxfordshire